Lukoyanovsky District is an administrative district (raion), one of the forty in Nizhny Novgorod Oblast, Russia. Municipally, it is incorporated as Lukoyanovsky Municipal District. It is located in the south of the oblast. Its administrative center is the town of Lukoyanov. Population: 32,384 (2010 Census);  The population of Lukoyanov accounts for 46.2% of the district's total population.

History
The district was established in 1929.

Notable residents 

Nikolay Urvantsev (1893–1985), Soviet geologist and explorer, born in Lukoyanov 
Valery Taliev (1872–1932), botanist and evolutionary biologist, born in Lukoyanov

References

Notes

Sources

Districts of Nizhny Novgorod Oblast
States and territories established in 1929
 
